Rear Admiral David Colin Proctor is an officer in the Royal New Zealand Navy, who was appointed Chief of Navy on 29 November 2018.

References

Living people
People from Napier, New Zealand
Royal New Zealand Navy admirals
Year of birth missing (living people)